On 12 July 2015, a riot occurred at Plaza Low Yat, Jalan Imbi, Kuala Lumpur. Three people were injured including a journalist during the commotion. This riot had been widely covered in the Malaysian mass media. Police believed that the riots occurred following a fight involving seven men at Plaza Low Yat, over alleged theft and a misunderstanding of smartphones, with losses estimated at over RM70,000. A total of 18 people were reportedly arrested for being involved in the riot.

Aftermath 
Following the riot, the Prime Minister at the time, Najib Razak insisted that the incident should be seen as a criminal act and not a racial problem. Najib described the actions of some parties who used social media to incite the racial element in the incident as irresponsible and gave an inaccurate perspective on what actually happened. He also asked the Inspector-General of Police, Khalid Abu Bakar to take effective action to prevent similar incidents from happening again. Five days after the riots, Plaza Low Yat continued to be the main choice for visitors to buy mobile phones as well as computers and software.

References 

2015 in Malaysia
2015 riots
History of Kuala Lumpur
Riots and civil disorder in Malaysia